
The following lists events that happened during 1801 in South Africa.

Events
 The Truter-Somerville Expedition of Petrus Johannes Truter, William Somerville, John Barrow and Samuel Daniell with missionaries Jan Matthys Kok and William Edwards reaches Dithakong near current day Kuruman

Births
 7 September – Sarel Cilliers, a Voortrekker leader and preacher is born on a farm near Paarl, Cape Colony

References
See Years in South Africa for list of References

History of South Africa